The 2022 season of Papua New Guinea National Rugby League competition was the 32nd  season of the premier rugby league competition in Papua New Guinea since 1991.

Teams 

The competition will still have 12 franchise teams competing in 2022 even though five bid teams submitted their bids to join an expanded competition. The five bid teams were Sepik Pride, Simbu Angras, Motu Koita Clansmen, New Ireland Chiefs and Moresby South Blacks.

Regular season

Ladder 

 The team highlighted in blue has clinched the minor premiership
 Teams highlighted in green have qualified for the finals
 The team highlighted in red has clinched the wooden spoon

Finals series

References

Papua New Guinea National Rugby League
2022 in Papua New Guinea rugby league